Leo Leous Isacson (April 20, 1910 – September 21, 1996) was a New York attorney and politician.  He was notable for winning a 1948 election to the United States House of Representatives from New York's twenty-fourth district (Bronx) as the candidate of the American Labor Party in what at that time The New York Times called "a test of Truman-[versus]-Wallace strength" with regard to the upcoming U.S. presidential elections and a "test today of the third-party movement headed by Henry A. Wallace".

Early life

Leo Isacson was born on April 20, 1910, in Manhattan, New York City, New York to a Jewish family. He had two sisters, Ruth (later Thielle) and Regina (later Hymowitz). He attended the public schools, then graduated from New York University in 1931 and New York University School of Law in 1933.

Career

Isacson was admitted to the bar in 1933 or 1934 and commenced practice in New York City. He defended labor and tenant cases.

In 1936, Isacson became a member at the founding of the American Labor Party (ALP, which sought to advance the cause of trade unions).

New York State Assembly

In 1944, he was elected to represent the (Bronx Co., 13th D.) in the New York State Assembly as the candidate of the ALP and the Republican Party, and he served from 1945 to 1946 as a member of the 165th New York State Legislature. He lost re-election in 1946.

In 1945, while serving in the Assembly, Leo Isacson ran for Borough President of the Bronx, coming in second with 25% of the vote.

On January 6, 1947, the ALP named Isacson their "legislative representative".

1948 special Bronx election

On February 17, 1948, Isacson won a stunning victory over Democratic nominee Karl Propper.  Propper was a former president of the Bronx Bar Association, and his supporters included Eleanor Roosevelt and New York City Mayor William O'Dwyer. A special election was held to fill the vacancy caused by the resignation of Benjamin J. Rabin to the New York Supreme Court. Isacson received public support, first on January 24 from the Greater New York CIO Council, then on February 11 by radio and February 15 in a speech from former U.S. Vice President Henry A. Wallace. 

During the election, the Greater New York CIO Council charged that FBI agents had been visiting offices of "left wing" CIO locals to "intimidate them and curtail their political activity in behalf of Henry A. Wallace".  In contrast, the Amalgamated Clothing Workers of America (ACWA), a more conservative CIO union opposed to Wallace, confirmed that FBI agents had visited many of its locals to investigate possible violations of the Hatch Act of 1939, regarding political activities, and declared the FBI had given the ACWA a "clean bill of health". The spokesman said similar inquiries had been made among other CIO and AFL unions pursuant to the law.  The council also telegrammed U.S. Attorney General Tom C. Clark to ask him to call off further FBI investigation. The Council admitted that, while FBI agents had always asked permission to check records of CIO-PAC contributions, these records were already available from the Secretary of State of New York and the New York City Board of Elections, leading the council to question the FBI's motives.  The Council claimed that the FBI's investigation was "an obvious and reprehensible attempt to intimidate and harass unions and union members in the exercise of their political rights, particularly with respect to the 1948 Presidential and Congressional elections". Nathan Witt, the council's legal counselor, disagreed, stating, "There could not possibly be any technical violation in 1948 except for the Isacson election and the FBI agents made clear they were not investigating that."

During the campaign, Mayor O'Dwyer made front-page headlines when he urged Wallace to leave the Progressive Party and rejoin the Democratic Party. In a speech, O'Dwyer said, "The election of 1948 will result in the choice of either the Democratic or the Republican party," ruling out any chance of election of the Wallace ticket and reminded voters that "the Democratic party is by its very nature the party of labor, of small business, small farmers and independents–the backbone of our economy, the overwhelming mass of our population." Wallace rejected O'Dwyer's plea in his speech the next day and stood side by side with Isacson in front of crowds.  Meanwhile, Liberal Party co-founder Adolf A. Berle denounced Wallace as a "front for an international intrigue". He claimed Wallace wanted to "appease Russia"–in the same way Neville Chamberlain sought to appease Nazi Germany.

Two days before the election, The New York Times analyzed the shifting background of the Progressive Party:    The question involved in the special election is how strongly the Labor [ALP] party vote will hold up after withdrawal of the Amalgamated Clothing Workers of America and other anti-Communist unions from the Labor party because of its support of Mr. Wallace's candidacy for President, which has left the Communists and other left-wing elements in complete control of that party's organization.    Isacson beat Propper 22,697 votes or 55.8% to 12,598 votes or 31%, with Dean Alfange of the newly formed Liberal Party at 3,840 votes and Republican Joseph A. De Nigris with 1,482.  New York CIO Council secretary Saul Mills said shortly before the election: This is the first test of labor's independent political strength in the crucial 1948 elections. We are confident we can prove that strength and give the '48 campaign a proper sendoff with the election of Leo Isacson.

"Wallace" victory

The Washington Post declared "Henry A. Wallace yesterday jolted Democratic hopes of holding New York in November" with the election of the ALP's Isacson and noted that it was "Wallace's first test at the polls since he broke with the Democratic Administration to form a third party and make his own bid for the Presidency".

The New York Times stated that the election of the ALP's Isacson over the Democratic candidate Propper would have many effects, including that: 
 Wallace, as a third-party presidential candidate, would poll a much larger vote than expected, i.e., that Truman had little chance of winning New York State in the 1948 general elections
 Wallace had a better chance in other states, as did other third-party candidates for Congressional and local offices
 New York Governor Thomas E. Dewey might not clinch the Republican nomination but rather U.S. Senator Robert A. Taft
 Both the Democratic National Committee and the Bronx Democratic organization had suffered a major setback
 The New York State Assembly would ask Mayor O'Dwyer to hold off on a rise in fare for mass transportation

The next day, Wallace announced that his Progressive Party had won a place in the California primaries.

Two days later, The Washington Post was still assessing the implications of Bronx congressional election: The outcome of Tuesday's special election in New York's Twenty-fourth Congressional District confirms what most political commentators have for some time surmised that Henry Wallace, if he wishes to do so, can deprive the Democratic candidate of New York State's 47 electoral votes next November. Thus, as a political portent, the election possesses great significance which will not be lost upon the kingmakers in either of the major parties.  The Post also believed that (in retrospect, just four months before declaration of the State of Israel) "According to all seasoned political observers, it was the Palestine issue that gave the victory to Leo Isacson, the Henry Wallace-American Labor Party candidate, in the special congressional election in the Bronx. This overwhelming upset of the strong Bronx machine of Edward J. Flynn indicates what political dynamite there is in Palestine, for a President now eagerly seeking reelection and clearly dependent on carrying such States as New York" (the "President" here referring to Truman).

On February 21, 1948, the Progressive Party formed its Michigan chapter.

On February 23, 1948, The New York Times was still analyzing the election in an article whose headline read "Isacson's Victory Is Aid to Wallace in Major States" with the subtitle "Adds Strength to Third-Party Movement for Presidency, A Survey Discloses".  The Times stated that Wallace had gained Electoral College support in the states of Michigan, Illinois, Pennsylvania, and California.

However, on February 25, 1948, the victory diminished somewhat when Simon W. Gerson, candidate for the New York City Council to fill the seat of the late communist council member Peter V. Cacchione, found himself denied a council seat when council members voted 14 to 4 against him.  The four council members who supported his candidacy were: Benjamin J. Davis Jr. ("Harlem Communist"), Michael J. Quill ("Bronx Laborite"), Eugene P. Connolly ("Manhattan Laborite"), and Stanley M. Isaacs ("Manhattan Republican"). Afterwards, "warning that "all the Wallace forces are behind the seating of Mr. Gerson, Mr. Connolly said he would introduce another resolution to seat him at a later date."  Councilman Edward Rager ("Manhattan Republican") said the underlying issue over Gerson was Communism; Rager also said Communists were "largely responsible" for Leo Isacson's election. Quill, who had supported Isacson, "denied that Communists had won that election".

U.S. Congress

Isacson served from February 17, 1948, to January 3, 1949.

By one measure, Isacson was the second most liberal person to serve in Congress between 1937 and 2002 (second only to William H. Meyer). He opposed the Marshall Plan and the peacetime draft, and was one of three Congressmen to oppose legislation to increase the size of the Air Force. He also pushed for immediate recognition of the State of Israel.

He also changed the situation for fellow ALP New York Representative Vito Marcantonio. Until Isacson's election, as commentator Drew Pearson wrote at the time: Rambunctious, left-wing Representative Vito Marcantonio of New York has long been "majority leader," the "party whip," and the total membership of the American Labor Party in Congress. He has labored alone–a situation perfectly okay with Vito, for he likes to consider himself a modern David jousting with the "big interests".

In March 1948, he continued public speaking in New York City on topics that included Palestine, thanks to sponsorship that included the ALP and the Progressive Citizens of America.  Isacson joined fellow New York ALP representative Vito Marcantonio and Democrats in voting unsuccessfully against an "unprecedented" $200,000 appropriation to the House Un-American Activities Committee.

In April 1948, he became the first Congressman ever to be denied a United States passport by the State Department when he attempted to go to Paris to attend a conference as an observer for the American Council for a Democratic Greece, a Communist front organization, because of the group's role in opposing the Greek government in the Greek Civil War. Issuing him a passport was judged not to be "in the interests of the US", so he was denied a passport under the Passport Act of 1926 (currently codified at  et seq.), which allows the Presidential administration to deny or revoke passports for foreign policy or national security reasons at any time. Henry A. Wallace's Progressive Party welcomed Isacson's election.

In September 1948, Isacson stumped for Wallace in New York City with fellow ALP candidates Marcantonio (Harlem), Irma Lindheim (Queens), and Lee Pressman (Brooklyn). "Representative Isacson declared that President Truman would learn during the campaign that he could not hide the responsibility of the Democratic party for the bi-partisan assault on the liberties of the American people. He declared that the Taft-Hartley Act was passed with the help of a majority of Democratic Representatives, that four out of five Democrats in Congress voted for the peacetime draft and for continuance of the Committee on Un-American Activities."

In the fall of 1948, he ran for reelection against Isidore Dollinger. Neither he nor other ALP candidates received the endorsement of the New England Regional CIO-PAC. Like other contenders, Dollinger lumped Isacson among other ALP leaders (e.g., Vito Marcantonio) as a Communist. (In February 1948, Pravda newspaper hailed Isacson's election as a victory for progressive forces in Europe and America, while Pravda commentator Boris Leontiev predicted worldwide defeat for imperialists.) Isacson lost to Dollinger 44,257 to 74,594.

Later
In 1949 Leo Isacson made a second run for Borough President of the Bronx. As the ALP nominee, he received 16.7% of the vote, coming in third place behind the Democrat winner and the Liberal Party candidate.

Isacson returned to his law practice.  He lived in Eastchester. He became active in the Democratic Party. In 1968, he served as a delegate to the Democratic National Convention.

In the early 1970s, he moved to Tamarac, Florida, and taught as an adjunct professor of political science at Nova Southeastern University.

Personal life and death
In 1937, Isacson married Rose Rakowitz (1912-1988). They were the parents of two daughters, Dale and Jill.  Jill was murdered in 1981, a crime which was never solved.  Rose Rakowitz Isacson died in 1988.  Around 1990, Isacson married Violet.

Isacson died of cancer at a hospital in Fort Lauderdale, Florida, on September 21, 1996.

See also
List of Jewish members of the United States Congress
 Vito Marcantonio
 American Labor Party
 Henry A. Wallace
 State of Israel

References

External links

Democratic Party members of the United States House of Representatives from New York (state)
1910 births
1996 deaths
Nova Southeastern University faculty
New York University School of Law alumni
People from Manhattan
Democratic Party members of the New York State Assembly
American Labor Party politicians
Deaths from cancer in Florida
American Labor Party members of the United States House of Representatives
20th-century American politicians
Politicians from the Bronx
Jewish American state legislators in New York (state)
Jewish members of the United States House of Representatives
20th-century American Jews